The New York State Mathematics League (NYSML) competition was originally held in 1973 and has been held annually in a different location each year since. It was founded by Alfred Kalfus. The American Regions Math League competition is based on the format of the NYSML competition.

External links
NYSML Homepage

Mathematics competitions